Rashida Leah Jones (born February 25, 1976) is an American actress, writer, producer, and director.
Jones appeared as Louisa Fenn on the Fox drama series Boston Public (2000–2002), as Karen Filippelli on the NBC comedy series The Office (2006–2009; 2011), and as Ann Perkins on the NBC comedy series Parks and Recreation (2009–2015). From 2016 to 2019, Jones starred as the lead eponymous role in the TBS comedy series Angie Tribeca, and in 2020, Jones starred as Joya Barris in the Netflix series #blackAF.

Jones also appeared in the films I Love You, Man (2009), The Social Network (2010), Our Idiot Brother (2011), The Muppets (2011), Celeste and Jesse Forever (2012), which she co-wrote, and Tag (2018). Jones also co-wrote the story of Toy Story 4 (2019).

She worked as a producer on the film Hot Girls Wanted (2015) and the series Hot Girls Wanted: Turned On (2017), directing the first episode of the latter. Both works explore the sex industry. In 2018, her documentary Quincy, about her father, Quincy Jones, debuted on Netflix; it won the Grammy Award for Best Music Film in 2019.

Early life and education
Jones was born in Los Angeles, California, to actress Peggy Lipton and musician/record producer Quincy Jones. She is the younger sister of actress and model Kidada Jones, and half-sister to five siblings from their father's other relationships, including Kenya Jones and Quincy Jones III. Jones's father has Tikar roots from Cameroon, and a Welsh paternal grandfather. Her mother was Ashkenazi Jewish (a descendant of Jewish emigrants from Russia and Latvia). Jones and her sister were raised in Reform Judaism by their mother; Jones attended Hebrew school, though she left at the age of ten and did not have a bat mitzvah.

Jones grew up in Los Angeles's Bel Air neighborhood. She has said of her parents' mixed-race marriage: "it was the 1970s and still not that acceptable for them to be together". In his autobiography, her father recalled how he would often find the six-year-old Jones under the covers after bedtime, reading five books at a time with a flashlight. She has said that she grew up a "straight-up nerd" and "had a computer with floppy disks and a dial-up modem before it was cool". Jones displayed musical ability from an early age and can play classical piano. Her mother told Entertainment Tonight in 1990 that Jones was "also a fabulous singer and songwriter".

Jones attended The Buckley School in Sherman Oaks, California, where she made the National Honor Society and was voted "Most Likely To Succeed" by her classmates. Jones was involved with theater at Buckley, with tutelage from acting teacher Tim Hillman. Jones's parents divorced when she was 14 years old; her sister subsequently remained with their father, while Rashida moved with their mother to Brentwood. In 1994, Jones garnered attention with an open letter responding to scathing remarks made by rapper Tupac Shakur about her parents' interracial marriage in The Source. Shakur, who later apologized for these remarks, went on to be friends with Rashida and her family. Rashida's sister, Kidada, was dating Tupac at the time of his death.

Rashida attended Harvard University, where she lived in Currier House and Eliot House. She belonged to the Hasty Pudding Theatricals, Harvard Radcliffe Dramatic Club, Harvard-Radcliffe Opportunes, Black Students Association, and the Signet Society. She was initially interested in becoming a lawyer but changed her mind after becoming disillusioned by the O. J. Simpson murder trial. She became involved in the performing arts and served as musical director for the Opportunes, an a cappella group, co-composed the score for the 149th annual Hasty Pudding Theatricals performance, and acted in several plays. In her second year at college, Jones performed in For Colored Girls Who Have Considered Suicide / When the Rainbow Is Enuf, which she said was "healing" because she had been seen by many black students as not being "black enough". She studied religion and philosophy and graduated in 1997.

Career

Acting
Jones made her professional acting debut in The Last Don, 1997 miniseries based on the novel by Mario Puzo. She next appeared in Myth America, East of A and If These Walls Could Talk 2. In 2000, she guest-starred as Karen Scarfolli on Freaks and Geeks before landing the role of Louisa Fenn on Boston Public. Between 2000 and 2002, she appeared in 26 episodes, earning an NAACP Image Award nomination in her final year. Although she had a minor supporting role in the series, film opportunities quickly surfaced. She had a small role in Full Frontal, directed by Steven Soderbergh, and starred in Now You Know, written and directed by Kevin Smith regular Jeff Anderson. She also starred in the short film Roadside Assistance with Adam Brody.

After Jones left Boston Public, she appeared in Death of a Dynasty, directed by Damon Dash, and two episodes of Chappelle's Show on Comedy Central. In 2004, she was cast in Strip Search, an HBO film directed by Sidney Lumet, but her scenes were cut from the final broadcast version. Later that year, she played Dr. Rachel Keyes in Little Black Book and starred as Edie Miller in the British drama series NY-LON. In 2005, Jones played Karen in the Stella pilot on Comedy Central and special government agent Carla Merced in the TNT police drama Wanted.

Jones was considering leaving the acting profession and pursuing a graduate degree in public policy before she was offered the part on The Office. She joined the ensemble cast in September 2006, playing the role of Karen Filippelli. She appeared regularly during the third season, returning as a guest star for three episodes in seasons four, five, and seven.

Jones also played Karen in the February 2007 Saturday Night Live episode hosted by Rainn Wilson, appearing briefly in the opening monologue's Office parody. Jones filmed cameo roles in The Ten and Role Models, both directed by David Wain, with the latter appearing on the Blu-ray release. She co-starred in Unhitched, the short-lived 2008 comedy series produced by the Farrelly brothers. She also appeared as the love interest in the Foo Fighters' music video "Long Road to Ruin".

In January 2009, Jones voiced several characters in an episode of the Adult Swim show Robot Chicken. She played Hannah in Brief Interviews with Hideous Men, an independent film by John Krasinski that screened during the 2009 Sundance Film Festival. She co-starred as Zooey Rice in I Love You, Man, a DreamWorks comedy with Paul Rudd and Jason Segel.

Jones accepted a role in Parks and Recreation, a mockumentary-style sitcom on NBC. The show was created by Greg Daniels and Michael Schur, with whom she previously worked on The Office. She played nurse Ann Perkins from the show's debut until midway through the sixth season, and reprised the role for the final episode of the series.

Jones had a small role in the 2010 Kevin Smith film Cop Out. She appeared in The Social Network (2010), alongside Jesse Eisenberg and Andrew Garfield, which is set at Harvard. She played Marylin Delpy, a second-year legal associate assisting with the defense of Facebook founder Mark Zuckerberg.

Jones starred opposite Chris Messina in Monogamy (2010), a drama directed by Dana Adam Shapiro. The film premiered at the Tribeca Film Festival in April 2010 and was released theatrically in March 2011.

Jones's other 2011 films were Friends with Benefits, starring Justin Timberlake and Mila Kunis; The Big Year, with Steve Martin, Owen Wilson, and Jack Black; The Muppets, with Jason Segel, Amy Adams and Chris Cooper; and Our Idiot Brother, with Paul Rudd, Elizabeth Banks and Emily Mortimer. In the latter she played a lesbian lawyer named Cindy, the caring girlfriend of a bisexual character played by Zooey Deschanel. Jones also has a cameo in the Beastie Boys' short film Fight For Your Right Revisited, which premiered at the 2011 Sundance Film Festival. Additionally, Jones appeared on an episode of Wilfred as Lisa, a hospice volunteer. The episode aired on July 21, 2011, on FX.

In 2012, she starred opposite Andy Samberg in the film Celeste and Jesse Forever, which she co-wrote.

Along with Danny DeVito, she was a voice guest star in The Simpsons episode "The Changing of the Guardian" (season 24, episode 11).

In 2014, Jones was cast in the lead role of Angie Tribeca on the TBS comedy series Angie Tribeca, which premiered in 2016. The show was created by Steve and Nancy Carell and was cancelled in 2019.

In 2015, Jones produced the documentary film Hot Girls Wanted, which examines the role of teenage girls in pornographic films. Netflix acquired the film after the film's premiere at Sundance Film Festival; it premiered on May 29, 2015. A spin-off series, Hot Girls Wanted: Turned On, debuted in 2017; Jones was a producer and directed the first episode. Jones is due to be involved in an adaptation of Sell/Buy/Date, a play about the sex industry. Through her involvement in Hot Girls Wanted, Jones has gathered a negative reputation among sex workers, as they see the film and series as unfairly depicting the industry and as violating performers' consent. Turned On was criticized after some people who appeared in it said that they did not give permission or withdrew permission, and that the series included their images or personal details without consent.

In 2020, Jones began starring and serving as an executive producer on the Netflix sitcom #blackAF opposite Kenya Barris, who created the series. Jones also voices recurring role of Mia on Fox's Duncanville. She stars in the 2020 comedy-drama On the Rocks opposite Bill Murray directed by Sofia Coppola.

Writing
Jones created Frenemy of the State, a comic book series about a socialite who is recruited by the CIA. The comics are published by Oni Press and co-written with husband-and-wife writing team Nunzio DeFilippis and Christina Weir. In October 2009, before the first issue had been released, Jones sold the screen rights to Universal Pictures and Imagine Entertainment. Brian Grazer and Eric Gitter produced the film, and Jones co-wrote the screenplay with writing partner Will McCormack.

Jones sold her first screenplay, a comedy titled Celeste and Jesse Forever, in March 2009. She co-wrote the script with McCormack and was attached to star in the film. It was released in 2012.

In 2016, Jones co-wrote the teleplay of "Nosedive", an episode of the television anthology series Black Mirror with Michael Schur from a story by Charlie Brooker.

Jones and McCormack worked on the script of Toy Story 4 for Pixar Animation Studios. Jones left the writing assignment early due to feeling that Pixar is "a culture where women and people of color do not have an equal creative voice". The film was released in June 2019, with the pair being among those receiving a "story by" credit.

Jones has been published in Teen Vogue magazine, where she worked as a contributing editor. She wrote chapter 36 of her father's biography, Q: The Autobiography of Quincy Jones (2001).

Jones contributed a "thank-you note" to Michelle Obama in The New York Times in 2016 which was excerpted in the 2017 book Courage Is Contagious.

Music and related videos

As a singer, Jones has provided backing vocals for the band Maroon 5. She appears on the tracks "Tangled", "Secret" and "Not Coming Home" from their debut record, Songs About Jane, and on "Kiwi" from the follow-up album It Won't Be Soon Before Long. Jones was a guest vocalist on the Tupac Shakur tribute album, The Rose That Grew from Concrete, released in 2000. The track, "Starry Night", also featured her father's vocals, Mac Mall's rapping, and her half-brother QD3's production. Jones also contributed vocals on the song "Dick Starbuck: Porno Detective" on The High & Mighty's 1999 debut Home Field Advantage.

Jones contributed vocals to songs on The Baxter, The Ten and Reno 911!: Miami soundtracks. She sang in some episodes of Boston Public and for charitable events such as the What A Pair Benefit in 2002 to raise money for breast cancer research. In May 2015, Jones released a song titled Wanted to Be Loved alongside Daniel Ahearn, the song was used in the documentary Hot Girls Wanted, which Jones produced.

In 2002, Jones appeared in the video to "More Than a Woman" by Aaliyah alongside her sister Kidada Jones and then-boyfriend Mark Ronson. Jones has also appeared in music videos for The Boy Least Likely To song "Be Gentle With Me", and the Foo Fighters' single "Long Road to Ruin". In the latter she was credited as Racinda Jules and played the role of Susan Belfontaine. In 2013, Jones directed the music video for Sara Bareilles' song "Brave". It marked her debut as a director.

In 2016, she featured in the music video "Flip and Rewind" by Boss Selection, with the video directed by Jones and McCormack.

Online comedy series
Jones has appeared in several online comedy series projects. She starred in Funny or Die's Speak Out series with Natalie Portman and guest-starred in two episodes in the first webseason Web Therapy with Lisa Kudrow. Due to other commitments, Jones was unable to reprise her role for the second, third and fourth seasons, provided voiceover work for an off-screen appearance in the show's first TV season (containing her appearance from the first web season), and was able to make time to reprise her role on-screen for an exclusive appearance in the second-season finale of the show. She also played David Wain in disguise for an episode of My Damn Channel's Wainy Days. In 2008, Jones appeared with several other celebrities in Prop 8 – The Musical, an all-star video satirising California's anti-gay marriage initiative, written by Marc Shaiman. From 2013 to 2015, she provided the voice of Hotwire on the Hulu comedy series The Awesomes.

Modeling and advertising
In 2011, Dove selected Jones as its spokeswoman for its Dove Nourishing Oil Care Collection. In 2015, she began starring in a series of commercials for Verizon FiOS. In 2017, Jones became a spokeswoman for the Almay brand of cosmetics. In 2018, Jones became the first female ambassador for Maison Kitsune. In 2019, she modeled for and endorsed the glasses brand, Zenni Optical. She has also served as the narrating voice for Southwest Airlines and Expedia as well as appearing in Expedia television commercials.

During the February 2022 Super Bowl LVI, she appeared alongside Tommy Lee Jones, Leslie Jones, and Nick Jonas in a Toyota commercial for the Tundra pickup truck entitled 'keeping up with the Joneses' with background music 'It's Not Unusual' by Tom Jones.

Podcasting
In November 2020 Jones started the Bill Gates and Rashida Jones Ask Big Questions podcast with co-host Bill Gates.

Other ventures
In September 2018, Jones's production company, Le Train Train, signed a first-look television deal with MRC.

Personal life

Though raised Jewish, Jones began practicing Hinduism in her early teens with her mother, after the two visited an ashram in India. As an adult, she practices Judaism. She told a reporter:

On her multi-racial identity, she has remarked "I have gone through periods where I only feel black or Jewish. Now I have a good balance." and "The thing is, I do identify with being black, and if people don't identify me that way, that's their issue. I'm happy to challenge people's understanding of what it looks like to be biracial..."

Jones was engaged to music producer Mark Ronson in February 2003. He proposed on her 27th birthday, using a custom-made crossword puzzle spelling out "Will you marry me?" Their relationship ended approximately one year later.

In 2018, Jones had a son with her boyfriend, musician Ezra Koenig.

Public image

Philanthropic efforts
Jones has worked to promote Peace First (formerly Peace Games), a nonprofit that teaches children to resolve conflict without violence. She has been a board member since 2004 and holds several annual benefits to raise money for the organization. Jones has participated in Stand Up to Cancer events, EDUN and ONE: The Campaign to Make Poverty History, and The Art of Elysium's volunteer program, which runs artistic workshops for hospitalized children. In 2007, she was honorary chair of the annual Housing Works benefit, which fights AIDS and homelessness in New York City. She has helped fundraise for St. Jude Children's Research Hospital, the EB Medical Research Foundation, and New York's Lower Eastside Girls Club.

Syria refugee camp visit 
In 2016, Jones visited a Syrian refugee camp in Lebanon. She wrote about the confronting experience for Vanity Fair. She also made a virtual reality movie to document her experiences, which appeared on rescue.org.

Political work
Jones has campaigned for Democratic Party presidential candidates. Jones campaigned for Democratic candidate John Kerry during the 2004 election, speaking at student rallies and a public gallery in Ohio.

She supported Barack Obama during the 2008 and 2012 presidential campaigns. In 2008, along with Kristen Bell, she visited college campuses in Missouri to discuss the candidates and to encourage voter registration for the Democratic Party. In 2012, she campaigned in Iowa along with Parks and Recreation co-star Adam Scott.

Accolades

 2002: Nominated – NAACP Image Award for Outstanding Supporting Actress in a Drama Series for Boston Public
 2011: Nominated – Independent Spirit Award for Best First Screenplay for Celeste and Jesse Forever
 2012: Nominated – NAACP Image Award for Outstanding Supporting Actress in a Comedy Series for Parks and Recreation
 2017: Nominated – NAACP Image Award for Outstanding Writing in a Television Movie for the episode "Nosedive" of Black Mirror
 2019: Won – Grammy Award for Best Music Film for Quincy
 2021: Nominated – Best Actress in a Motion Picture – Comedy or Musical for On the Rocks

References

External links

 
 
 
 
 
 
 
 
 
 

1976 births
Living people
20th-century American actresses
20th-century American Jews
20th-century American women writers
21st-century American actresses
21st-century American Jews
21st-century American non-fiction writers
21st-century American screenwriters
21st-century American women writers
Actresses from Los Angeles
African-American actresses
African-American Jews
African-American non-fiction writers
African-American screenwriters
African-American television producers
American autobiographers
American comics creators
American comics writers
American documentary film producers
American film actresses
American film producers
American feminist writers
American magazine editors
American music video directors
American people of Latvian-Jewish descent
American people of Russian-Jewish descent
American people of Cameroonian descent
American people of Tikar descent
American people of Welsh descent
American philanthropists
American television actresses
American voice actresses
American women comedians
American women non-fiction writers
American women screenwriters
American women television producers
California Democrats
Female comics writers
Film producers from California
Grammy Award winners
Harvard College alumni
Hasty Pudding alumni
Jewish American actresses
Jewish American writers
Jewish women writers
Music video codirectors
People from Brentwood, Los Angeles
Family of Quincy Jones
Reform Jewish feminists
Screenwriters from California
Television producers from California
Tikar people
Women autobiographers
American women documentary filmmakers
Women magazine editors
Writers from Los Angeles